Morten Strange (born 18 September 1952) is a Danish-born, Singapore-based independent financial analyst. He is a former bird photographer, author and publisher. 
Strange was born in Copenhagen, Denmark, and studied economics at Aarhus University 1971-73; he served in the Danish army as a sergeant in the field artillery. From 1974, Strange worked in the offshore oil industry in the North Sea and later in South-east Asia and China as a field services engineer; he retired from the oil business in 1986 as a field services supervisor. Since then, Strange has worked for the Danish Ornithological Society (as international officer 1994-1996), for Nature's Niche Pte Ltd (as marketing manager 1999-2008) and for Draco Publishing and Distribution Pte Ltd (as managing director 2008-2013). Strange was based in Singapore from 1980 to 1993 and again from 1999 onwards, and is now a Singapore permanent resident; he is the father of four sons from two marriages.

Before and after his oil field career, Strange was an active bird photographer, writer, and editor. He has authored many books, especially about rainforest birds in the South-east Asian region. He was editor-in-chief of Nature Watch, the official magazine of Nature Society (Singapore) from 2009-2012, and he is currently Honorary Secretary for that society. In 2014 he qualified from the Institute of Banking and Finance as a financial fund manager and adviser. He currently works as an independent financial analyst and is the author of Be Financially Free: How to become salary independent in today’s economy (Marshall Cavendish, 2016) as well as The Ethical Investor’s Handbook: How to grow your money without wrecking the Earth (Marshall Cavendish, 2018).

Bibliography 

  Terner (1971). Out of print
  Edderfuglen (1971). Out of print
  Strandskaden (1971). Out of print
  Hættemågen (1973). Out of print
  Viben (1973). Out of print
  Stæren (1973). Out of print
  Olieboring i Nordsøen (1979). Out of print
  En Sommer i Alaska (1980). Out of print
  A Photographic Guide to the Birds of Peninsular Malaysia and Singapore (1993). Out of print
  Parrots: A Selection (1994). Out of print
  Fuglene kender ikke Grænser (edited, 1996). Out of print
  Culture Shock! Denmark (1996). Available from Marshall Cavendish, 5th revised edition, 2009.
  Tropical Birds of Southeast Asia (1998). Out of print
  Birds of South-east Asia: A Photographic Guide (1998). Out of print
  A Photographic Guide to the Birds of Southeast Asia (Tuttle Publishing, 2000).
  A Photographic Guide to the Birds of Indonesia (Tuttle Publishing, 2001; Second Edition, 2012; reprinted 2015).
  Birds of Rusinga Island Lodge (2003). Out of print
  Birds of Campi ya Kanzi (2003). Out of print
  Birds of Kilalinda Lodge (2003). Out of print
  Birds of Fraser’s Hill (2004). Out of print
  Birds of Saruni Lodge (2004). Out of print
  Birds of Taman Negara (Nature’s Niche, 2006).
  Colugo: The Flying Lemur of South-east Asia (edited, 2007).
  A Passion for Birds (edited, 2008). Out of print
  Wild Animals of Singapore (edited, 2008; updated edition, 2012).
  Hornbills of the World: A Photographic Guide (with Dr. Pilai Poonswad and Dr. Alan Kemp; Draco Publishing, 2013).
  Be Financially Free: How to become salary independent in today’s economy (Marshall Cavendish, 2016; reprinted 2017, 2018).
  Be Financially Free, Complex Chinese (Domain Publishing Company, 2017).
  The Ethical Investor’s Handbook: How to grow your money without wrecking the Earth (Marshall Cavendish, 2018).

References 

 Culture Shock! Denmark – Morten Strange (Graphic Arts Center Publishing Company, 2006 edition).
 Birds of Indonesia – Morten Strange (Tuttle Publishing, 2012).

External links
The Fed Has Accepted Climate Change Risk – What’s Next? - Eco-Business article.
Are We in an Era of Uneconomic Growth? - Today article.
Be a Financial Doomsday Prepper! - The Finance article.
Collapse Is Inevitable, Here's Why - Finance and Liberty interview.
Read with Michelle Martin: ‘The Ethical Investor’s Handbook’
The Environment and Your Money - National University of Singapore lecture.
Birding in Just One Tree - Singapore Birding Group article.
Start Planning for Retirement as Soon as You Start Work
Conserve All Capital

Danish male writers
Danish photographers
1952 births
Living people
People from Copenhagen
Aarhus University alumni